Edith Farnadi (25 September 1921 – 12 or 14 December 1973) was a Hungarian pianist.

She was born in Budapest and began her studies at the age of 7 at the Franz Liszt Academy of Music. She studied with Professor Arnold Székely (also a teacher of Louis Kentner). At the age of 9, she made her musical debut as a child prodigy. At the age of 12, she played Beethoven's Piano Concerto No. 1, directing the orchestra from the piano.  She received her diploma from the Musical Academy in Budapest when she was 17 years old. During her studies at the Music Academy she won the Franz Liszt Prize twice. She became a professor at the Budapest Franz Liszt Academy where she remained until 1942. She then concertized widely throughout Europe in the 1950s and made recordings with the Westminster Label. In ensemble she performed with the Barylli Quartet.

It was while still a student in Budapest that she became a steady musical partner with the great Hungarian violinist Jenő Hubay. At the International Musical afternoons at the Budapest Palais, she performed many times with Bronisław Huberman.

Partial discography
 Tchaikovsky Piano Concertos No. 1 & 2 - Westminster LP WL 5309, 1954
 Liszt Piano Concertos No. 1 & 2 - Westminster LP WL 5158
 Liszt Hungarian Rhapsodies Vol. 1 (1-8) - Westminster LP WAL 213
 Dvorak Piano Quintet with the Barylli Quartet - Westminster W 9025
Rachmaninoff, Piano Concerto No.2 in C Minor, Opus 18 - Westminster LP XWN 18275 (Probably mid-1950s)

References

1921 births
1973 deaths
Franz Liszt Academy of Music alumni
Academic staff of the Franz Liszt Academy of Music
Hungarian classical pianists
Hungarian women pianists
Women classical pianists
20th-century classical pianists
20th-century classical musicians
20th-century composers
Jewish classical pianists
20th-century women composers
20th-century women pianists